Indigo is a 1992 novel written by Marina Warner, published by Chatto & Windus in the UK and Simon & Schuster in the US. It is a modernized and altered retelling of William Shakespeare's The Tempest.

Within the novel, Warner appropriates Shakespeare's original plot and characters to fit a dual reality, spanning the 17th and 20th centuries, and the colonial sphere of the Caribbean alongside post-colonial London. She expands certain characters: for example, Sycorax, Shakespeare's dark witch, is given her own identity as indigo maker and village sage. The colonialist realities of 'discovery' and the conquering of 'new' lands are played out in the novel's first section. Finally, the characters of Miranda and Caliban (recreated as Dulé and George/Shaka) are unified in a shared acknowledgement of past colonial wrongs.

Further reading
 Döring, Tobias. (2001). "Woman, Foundling, Hyphen: The Figure of Ariel in Marina Warner's Indigo", in Alizès: revue angliciste de la rèunion 20: Writing as Re-Vision, ed. Eileen Williams-Wanquet, 9-26.
 Döring, Tobias. (1998). "Chains of Memory: English-Caribbean Cross-Currents in Marina Warner's Indigo and David Dabydeen's Turner", in: Across the Lines. Intertextuality and Transcultural Communication in the New Literatures in English, ed. Wolfgang Klooss. Amsterdam, Atlanta, 191-204.
 Döring, Tobias. (1996). "Writing is Continual Remapping. An Interview with Marina Warner", in Hard Times 56, 28-33.

1992 British novels
Modern adaptations of works by William Shakespeare
Novels based on The Tempest
Novels set in the Caribbean
Novels set in London
Chatto & Windus books